Wonogiri Regency is a regency in the southeastern part of Central Java province in Indonesia. It covers an area of 1,822.36 km2, and its population was 928,904 at the 2010 Census and 1,096,138 at the 2020 Census. The capital and largest town is Wonogiri, around 33 km southeast of the large Central Java metropolis of Surakarta.

Administrative districts
Wonogiri Regency is divided into twenty-five administrative districts (Indonesian: kecamatan), tabulated below with their areas and their populations at the 2010 Census and the 2020 Census. The table also includes the number of administrative villages (rural desa and urban kelurahan) in each district and its post code.

Notes: (a) Paranggupito District includes the whole of the Regency's sea coast (off the southern coast of Java). (b) Purwantoro District forms a salient stretching eastwards into East Java Province.

Agriculture
Wonogiri Regency is an area of agriculture and plantation, so most of people in the regency work as farmers. Generally, all areas of the regency produce much agriculture and plantation output. Casava, cacao, and cashew are examples of the plantation output that are relatively good. 
Wonogiri also has many special foods. They include nasi tiwul, emping, bakso, mie ayam, gudangan, etc.

Topography
Most of Wonogiri Regency's area is rocky and hilly due to its location on the Sewu highlands. Since these highlands are of the karst type, many caves can easily be found in Wonogiri Regency and at least 41 caves have been discovered so far starting with the famous Song Gilap cave, Song Putri cave at Pracimantoro, Ngantap cave, Putri Kencana cave at Giritontro and including many unnamed caves all over the regency.

Wonogiri Regency also has a dam called Gajah Mungkur Dam which has three main functions; as a power plant to produce Hydroelectricity; to provide water for rice fields around Bengawan Solo River through irrigation programs; and for tourism. The dam has created a reservoir covering 83 km2 which lies 6 km south of Wonogiri town..

Notable landmarks
Notable landmarks include:
 Gajah Mungkur Dam (Waduk Gajah Mungkur)
 Sembukan beach in Paranggupito District
 Nampu beach in Paranggupito District
 Kahyangan waterfall in Tirtomoyo District
 Kethu forest in Wonogiri District
 Putri Kencana cave in Pracimantoro District
 Girimanik waterfall in Slogohimo District
 Nggaguk Tirta Lestari swimming pool, cafe, restaurant in Jatisrono District
 Seper forest at Jatipurno
 Paragliding (Indonesian: Gantole) sports site nearby Gajah Mungkur dam
 Off-Roading nearby Gajah Mungkur dam
 Plinteng Semar Miracle Stone in Wonogiri District
 Gunung Kembar Gandul a small mountain in Wonogiri District
 Gunung Pegat Small Mountain at Ngadiroyo, Nguntoronadi District
 Gunung Kencur Small Mountain at Ngadiroyo, Nguntoronadi District

Transportation
 Wonogiri railway station
 Giri Adipura bus terminal

References

Regencies of Central Java
Solo River